Rollins is a surname which may refer to:

People
 Adrian Rollins (born 1972), English cricketer
 Al Rollins (1926–1996), Canadian ice hockey goaltender
 Annie Katsura Rollins, American Chinese shadow puppeteer
 Bridgett Rollins (born 1956), American model
 Brooke Rollins president of the Texas Public Policy Foundation
 Charlemae Hill Rollins (1897–1979), librarian, author and storyteller in African-American literature
 Clarke Rollins, Canadian petroleum distributor and political figure
 Daniel G. Rollins (1842-1897), New York County D.A.
 Danielle Rollins, American novelist
 Dennis Rollins, British jazz trombonist
 Doug Rollins, Canadian former politician
 Ed Rollins, American political strategist
 Edward H. Rollins (1824–1889), American politician from New Hampshire
 Frank W. Rollins (1860–1915), American lawyer, banker and Republican politician from New Hampshire
 Henry Rollins (born 1961), born Henry Garfield, American rock music performer, storyteller, author, actor and poet
 Howard Rollins (1950–1996), American television, film and stage actor
 Hyder Edward Rollins (1889-1958), American scholar and English professor
 Jack Rollins (producer) (born 1915), long-time producer of Woody Allen's films
 James Rollins, pen name of American author Dr. Jim Czajkowski
 James S. Rollins (1812–1888), American politician and lawyer from Missouri
 Jared Rollins (born 1977), American mixed martial artist
 Jerry Rollins (born 1955), WHA player
 Jimmy Rollins (born 1978), American baseball player
 John Rollins (golfer) (born 1975), American golfer
 John W. Rollins (1916–2000), American businessman and Republican politician from Delaware
 Kenny Rollins (1923–2012), American basketball player
 Kevin Rollins (born 1953), American businessman and philanthropist
 Lawson Rollins, musician
 Leslie Rollins, set decorator
 Orville Wayne Rollins, American businessman, co-founder of Rollins, Inc.
 Peter Rollins (born 1973)
 Rachael Rollins American lawyer and politician serving as the District Attorney of Suffolk County in Massachusetts
 Randall Rollins (born 1931), American businessman.
 Reed C. Rollins (1911–1998), American botanist and professor
 Rich Rollins, American former baseball player
 Rio Rollins, star of the "Rainbow Gate" TV series
 Rose Rollins (born 1978), American actress and model
 Seth Rollins  (born 1986), ring name of American professional wrestler Colby Lopez
 Shorty Rollins (1929–1998), NASCAR driver
 Sonny Rollins, American jazz tenor saxophonist
 Wayne Tree Rollins (born 1955), American basketball center
 Walter C. Rollins (1857–1908), American racehorse trainer
 Walter E. Rollins, alias Jack Rollins, co-writer of "Frosty the Snowman"
 Will Rollins (born 1984), American politician
 William Herbert Rollins, American scientist and dentist

Fictional characters
 Amanda Rollins, from Law and Order: Special Victims Unit
 Leonard Rollins, a character in the American sitcom television series Silver Spoons
 Tibby Rollins, from The Sisterhood of the Traveling Pants
 Will Rollins, from Freddy vs. Jason - see List of characters in the Nightmare on Elm Street series#Will Rollins

See also
 Rollin (disambiguation)